Tendring Enterprise Studio School was a 14–19 mixed, secondary studio school and sixth form in Clacton-on-Sea, Essex, England. It was established in 2012 and sponsored by the Academies Enterprise Trust.

The school closed in August 2016 following an announcement in June 2015. In a letter to parents, principal Ian Pearson said: “We now feel that the direction of the school has moved away from the original studio school concept and, consequently, the Department for Education has agreed to the request from our sponsor, the Academies Enterprise Trust, to close Tendring Enterprise Studio School in August 2016." Current Year Ten and Year Twelve pupils were able to finish their two-year courses at the school.

See also 
 List of schools in Essex

References 

Defunct schools in Essex
Defunct studio schools
Academies Enterprise Trust
Clacton-on-Sea
Educational institutions established in 2012
2012 establishments in England
Educational institutions disestablished in 2016
2016 disestablishments in England